Borrowed Time is the second studio album by British heavy metal band Diamond Head. It was recorded in 1981 and released in 1982, reaching Number 24 on the UK Albums Chart.

In a 2008 interview, guitarist Brian Tatler said that this was his favourite period with Diamond Head and that the band "seemed to be getting somewhere after six years of building".

Background 
This was the band's first major label released after being signed to MCA Records in 1981. As this was their first album under a major label, the album was much cleaner and better produced. However, some say that MCA was the wrong label for Diamond Head, which is one of the contributions to their downfall. Some have also questioned the necessity for "Am I Evil?" and "Lightning to the Nations" to be included on the album, since they had already appeared on the band's debut album, Lightning to the Nations. Although the reason for this was that their first album was only meant as a demo with the idea of Borrowed Time being their first official album. However, things have not quite worked out that way, with the former becoming their most notable work to date.

Originally, Borrowed Time was only released on CD in Japan, making it a highly collectible item. Although on 15 October 2008, it was released by Metal Mind Productions on CD format, with bonus tracks. However, this was limited to 2,000 copies. The release contains B-sides, such as "Dead Reckoning", which were previously unavailable on CD. However, Geffen Records have now issued the album on general release. The cover features a lavish Rodney Matthews illustrated gatefold sleeve, based on the album's Elric of Melniboné theme, which was the most expensive sleeve commissioned by MCA at that time.

Musical style 
This album saw the band move away from all-out heavy riffs and towards softer and more progressive songs, such as "In the Heat of the Night" and "Don't You Ever Leave Me", which was well-received by fans, as the former has remained a regular in the live set list to date.

Reception 

The album managed to get to No. 24 in the UK album charts, becoming the band's first and only album to chart. The band went on to perform a full scale UK arena tour, performing large venues such as London's Hammersmith Apollo.

The album failed to live up to prior expectations as the band's more commercial take to their music turned out to be a disappointment to critics.

Track listing

Personnel 
Per the liner notes
Sean Harris – vocals, backing vocals, percussion, vocoder
Brian Tatler – guitars, backing vocals
Colin Kimberley – bass, Taurus bass pedals, backing vocals
Duncan Scott – drums, percussion

References 

Diamond Head (band) albums
MCA Records albums
1982 albums
Albums produced by Mike Hedges
Albums with cover art by Rodney Matthews